John Tanner (1772 – 23 March 1858) was an English amateur cricketer who made 45 known appearances in first-class cricket matches between 1797 and 1826.

Tanner was mainly associated with Surrey teams but also played for Marylebone Cricket Club (MCC) and other teams.  He was "a bowler of some repute" and an occasional wicketkeeper.

Tanner lived at Sutton, Surrey where he died, aged 86. He was buried in the cemetery at Norwood.

References

1772 births
1858 deaths
English cricketers
English cricketers of 1787 to 1825
English cricketers of 1826 to 1863
Surrey cricketers
Sussex cricketers
Marylebone Cricket Club cricketers
Hampshire cricketers
Middlesex cricketers
Epsom cricketers
Gentlemen cricketers
St John's Wood cricketers
William Ward's XI cricketers
Lord Frederick Beauclerk's XI cricketers
George Osbaldeston's XI cricketers